Cleveland Mesa is a high, ice-covered mesa,  long and  wide, situated at the southeast end of Michigan Plateau, Antarctica. It was mapped by the United States Geological Survey from surveys and from U.S. Navy air photos, 1960–64, and named by the Advisory Committee on Antarctic Names for Harlan Cleveland, Assistant Secretary of State for International Organization Affairs, 1961–65, who was Chairman of the Antarctic Policy Group in 1965.

See also
Kivi Peak
Mink Peak, standing 2 nautical miles (4 km) north of Cleveland Mesa

References

External links

Mesas of Antarctica
Landforms of Marie Byrd Land